Rob Brown may refer to:

 Rob Brown (musician), member of the UK electronic band Autechre
 Rob Brown (saxophonist) (born 1962), American free jazz saxophonist
 Rob Brown (ice hockey) (born 1968), Canadian ice hockey player
 Rob Brown (actor) (born 1984), American actor
 Rob Brown (journalist), Canadian reporter and anchor for CTV News

See also
 Robert Brown (disambiguation)
 Bob Brown (disambiguation)
 Bobby Brown (disambiguation)
 Robby Brown (disambiguation)
 Robert Browne (disambiguation)